Nightmusic Volume 3 is the third compilation album by The Thrillseekers, featuring various trance and electronica artists.

Track listing 
 Disc 1: Fast Forward
 The Thrillseekers Ft Fisher – The Last Time
 Orkidea – Metaverse (Gareth Emery remix)
 Max Graham – Carbine
 Blank & Jones Ft Bernard Sumner – Miracle Cure (Martin Roth Nu Style Dub)
 The Jay Lumen Vibe – Siren (Original Mix)
 Breakfast Pres Loomer – Take Me Back (Mike Saint Jules Remix)
 Nic Chagall – What You Need (Marco V Remix)
 Ronski Speed Ft Aruna – All The Way
 Mark Pledger vs Matt Hardwick Ft Melinda Gareh – Fallen Tides
 Solarstone – 4ever
 Embrace – Embrace (Ferry Fix)
 Teya feat. Tiff Lacey – Only You (Simon Bostock Dub Mix)
 Simon Patterson – Smack
 Cartel – Buenos Aires
 Nitrous Oxide – Red Moon Slide

 Disc 2: Rewind
 Lange – Songless (Club Mix)
 Deadmau5 – Faxing Berlin (Chris Lake Edit)
 Tiësto pres Allure ft Julie Thompson – Somewhere Inside (Andy Duguid Remix)
 Dennis Sheppard – A Tribute To Life (Martin Roth Remix)
 First State Ft Anita Kelsey – Falling
 John O'Callaghan Ft Audrey Gallagher – Big Sky
 The Thrillseekers – By Your Side (Mind One Remix)
 Keenen & Anderson Ft Tiff Lacey – Runaway (Mat Zo Vocal Remix)
 Georgia vs The Stimulator – We Rise (Georgia dub)
 Adam Nickey – Never Gone (Above & Beyond Respray)
 Breakfast – The Horizon
 Evbointh – One Wish
 Markus Schulz Ft Dauby – Perfect (Agnelli & Nelson Remix)
 Oliver Smith – Nimbus
 Simon Patterson – Bulldozer

2008 compilation albums